Rwanda competed at the 2019 African Games held from 19 to 31 August 2019 in Rabat, Morocco. In total, athletes representing Rwanda won three bronze medals and the country finished in 37th place in the medal table.

Medal summary

Medal table 

|  style="text-align:left; width:78%; vertical-align:top;"|

|  style="text-align:left; width:22%; vertical-align:top;"|

Athletics 

Noel Hitimana and Marthe Yankurije competed in athletics.

Hitimana competed in the men's 10,000 metres event and Yankurije competed in the women's 10,000 metres event.

Hitimana finished in 5th place and Yankurije finished in 8th place.

Cycling 

Rwanda competed in both mountain bike and road cycling. Moise Mugisha won the bronze medal in the men's individual time trial. He was also part of the team that won the bronze medal in the men's team time trial.

Volleyball 

Rwanda competed in the men's beach volleyball tournament.

Patrick Akumuntu Kavalo and Olivier Ntagengwa won the bronze medal.

Benitha Mukandayisenga and Valentine Munezero competed in the women's beach volleyball tournament. They finished in 8th place.

References 

Nations at the 2019 African Games
2019
African Games